Kraaipan is a town in Ngaka Modiri Molema District Municipality in the North West province of South Africa.

References

Populated places in the Ratlou Local Municipality